Tiszaug is a  village in Bács-Kiskun county, in the Southern Great Plain region of southern Hungary.

Geography

Villages near by Tiszaug 
Cserkeszőlő
Tiszakécske
Lakitelek

Towns near by Tiszaug 
Kecskemét
Szolnok

References

Populated places in Bács-Kiskun County